God Gave Me Twenty Cents is a 1926 American silent drama film directed by Herbert Brenon and written by Elizabeth Meehan and John Russell. The film stars Lois Moran, Lya De Putti, Jack Mulhall, William Collier, Jr., Adrienne D'Ambricourt, Leo Feodoroff, and Rosa Rosanova. The film was released on November 20, 1926, by Paramount Pictures. It is based on the novel God Gave Me Twenty Cents by Dixie Willson, subsequently remade by Paramount British as a sound film Ebb Tide in 1932.

Cast
Lois Moran as Mary
Lya De Putti as Cassie Lang
Jack Mulhall as Steve Doren
William Collier, Jr. as Barney Tapman
Adrienne D'Ambricourt as Ma Tapman
Leo Feodoroff as Andre Dufour
Rosa Rosanova as Mrs. Dufour
Claude Brooke as The Florist

Preservation
With no prints of God Gave Me Twenty Cents located in any film archives, it is a lost film.

References

External links 

 
 

1926 films
1920s English-language films
Silent American drama films
1926 drama films
Paramount Pictures films
Films directed by Herbert Brenon
Lost American films
American black-and-white films
American silent feature films
Lost drama films
1926 lost films
1920s American films
Films with screenplays by John Russell (screenwriter)
Films based on American novels